José Guillermo Anaya Llamas (born 2 July 1968) is a Mexican politician affiliated with the PAN. As of 2013 he served as Deputy of both the LIX and LXII Legislatures of the Mexican Congress representing Coahuila. He also served as Senator during the LX and LXI Legislatures.

References

1968 births
Living people
Politicians from Torreón
National Action Party (Mexico) politicians
21st-century Mexican politicians
Universidad Iberoamericana alumni
Members of the Congress of Coahuila
20th-century Mexican politicians
Municipal presidents of Torreón
Deputies of the LIX Legislature of Mexico
Deputies of the LXII Legislature of Mexico
Members of the Chamber of Deputies (Mexico) for Coahuila